These are all the international matches played by Pakistan national field hockey from 1980 to 1989.

Competitive record overview

Results

1980

1981

1982

1983

1984

1985

1986

1987

1988

1989

Head-to-head record 

Field hockey in Pakistan